Town Brook may refer to:
Town Brook (Massachusetts)
Town Brook Historic and Archeological District
Town Brook, New Jersey
Town Brook (West Branch Delaware River)